Futom-e Olya (also Romanized as Fūtom-e ‘Olyā; also known as Fūtom and Fūtom-e Bālā) is a village in Hasan Reza Rural District, in the Central District of Juybar County, Mazandaran Province, Iran. At the 2006 census, its population was 301, in 72 families.

References 

Populated places in Juybar County